Favorite Song may refer to:
 "Favorite Song" (Colbie Caillat song), 2011 song featuring Common
 "Favorite Song" (Chance the Rapper song), 2013 song featuring Childish Gambino
 "Favorite Song" (Toosii song), 2023 song
 Favorite Song (TV series), Vietnamese music show
 Title equivalent to Song of the Year, currently or formerly used by:
 Nickelodeon Kids' Choice Awards
 Myx Music Award for Song of the Year, name from 2006 though 2017
 People's Choice Awards, name for overall award from 2015 though 2017; also by genre
 American Music Awards, by genre such as "Favorite Song – Pop/Rock"
 MTV Pilipinas for Favorite Song
 Vijay Award for Favourite Song

See also
 Favorite Songs of All, 1998 greatest hits album by Phillips, Craig and Dean
 Favorite son, political term
 Favorite (disambiguation)